Gerardo Justo Orozco Álvarez (born 1950) is a Costa Rican pastor, lawyer, mathematician and politician. Orozco has been member of Congress in two occasions (1998-2002 and 2010-2014) and presidential candidate.

Orozco was born in San José, Costa Rica on February 18, 1950. He's married to Yasmín Mata and has two children. Founder member of the Universidad Cristiana del Sur, a private university in Costa Rica, where he received his law degree. Orozco is also founder of Costa Rican Renewal Party, a Christian-based, conservative political party for which he held office as deputy twice. As Congressman, Orozco is heavily opposed all initiatives for same-sex marriage and civil unions and was accused of homophobia, especially after verbally confronting then-Congresswoman and future minister Carmen Muñoz, who is openly lesbian, accusing her of legislating in self-benefit. He also made several public comments that were considered offensive toward the gay community.

Corruption scandal 
In 2013 Orozco’s Southern Christian University was raided by judicial authorities pending investigation on charges of degree falsification and alleged exchange of sexual favors among students and teachers for grades. Costa Rica’s board of superior education CONESUP also opened an investigation over degrees and grades irregularities.

Arrest for sexual abuse charges 
Orozco was arrested in 2015 after three women accused him of sexual abuse. Allegedly after introduce them in different occasions in motel rooms under false premises. The alleged victims refuse to settle out of court. His Trial is currently pending.

References 

1950 births
Living people
20th-century Costa Rican lawyers
Costa Rican religious leaders
Costa Rican evangelicals
Members of the Legislative Assembly of Costa Rica
People from San José, Costa Rica
21st-century Costa Rican lawyers